Andrew Kopkind (August 24, 1935 – October 23, 1994) was an American journalist best known for his reporting during the tumult of the late 1960s; he wrote about the anti-Vietnam War protests, Civil Rights Movement, Student Nonviolent Coordinating Committee, Students for a Democratic Society, the Black Panther Party, the Weathermen, President Johnson's "Great Society" initiatives, and Ronald Reagan's California gubernatorial campaign.

Kopkind was born in New Haven, Connecticut. In 1957 he received a B.A. from Cornell University, where he was editor of the Cornell Daily Sun.

From 1958 to 1959, Kopkind worked as a reporter for The Washington Post. He then studied at the London School of Economics, receiving an M.S. in 1961.

In 1961, Kopkind joined Time magazine, reporting mainly from California. From 1965 to 1967, he was associate editor of The New Republic; from 1965 to 1969 he was a correspondent for New Statesman. In 1968, he founded Hard Times and worked briefly for Ramparts in 1970.

In 1968, he signed the "Writers and Editors War Tax Protest" pledge, vowing to refuse to pay taxes in protest of the Vietnam War.

From the 1970s onward, he contributed regularly to The Village Voice, The New York Review of Books, The Nation, and Grand Street.

In the early 1970s he and his longtime companion John Scagliotti hosted the Lavender Hour. the first commercial gay/lesbian radio show.

Kopkind wrote two books: America: The Mixed Curse (1969) and The Thirty Years' Wars: Dispatches and Diversions of a Radical Journalist, 1965-1994, an anthology of his writing published posthumously in 1995, with an introduction by Alexander Cockburn. Kopkind died of cancer in 1994, at age 59.

References

External links
Index of Kopkind's New York Review of Books articles
"The Age of Reaganism: A Man and a Movement", by Andrew Kopkind, The Nation, November 3, 1984
"Mystic Politics: Refugees from the New Left", by Andrew Kopkind, Ramparts, July 1973
"Andrew Kopkind's Wars", Rob Walker,The Texas Observer, July 14, 1995
Fragments from The Thirty Years' Wars

1935 births
1994 deaths
Deaths from cancer
Alumni of the London School of Economics
American male journalists
20th-century American journalists
American tax resisters
Cornell University alumni
American LGBT writers
Writers from New Haven, Connecticut
American LGBT journalists
The Village Voice people
The Nation (U.S. magazine) people
20th-century American non-fiction writers
20th-century American male writers
20th-century LGBT people